The Sachsenliga, formerly referred to as Landesliga Sachsen, is the sixth tier of the German football league system and the highest league in the German state of Saxony (German: Sachsen). Until the introduction of the 3. Liga in 2008 it was the fifth tier of the league system, until the introduction of the Regionalligas in 1994 the fourth tier.

Overview 
The Landesliga Sachsen was established in 1990 from twelve clubs as the highest league for the German state of Saxony, which was established after the league in October 1990, and the Saxon Football Association, SFV (German:Sächsischer Fußball Verband). It compromised the area of the three Bezirksligen of Chemnitz, Dresden and Leipzig. Each of those three leagues contributed four clubs to the new league. The Sachsenliga was established within the East German football league system and incorporated in the league system of the united Germany at the end of its first season, in 1991.

The league has been a feeder league, together with the Thüringenliga and Verbandsliga Sachsen-Anhalt, to the NOFV-Oberliga Süd, which its champion is directly promoted to. As such, it was the fourth tier of the German league system.

After the first season, the number of clubs in the league was increased to fourteen; in 1996 the league was again enlarged, to sixteen.

In 1994, with the establishment of the Regionalliga Nordost as the new third tier of the league system, the Sachsenliga fell to tier five in the system but remained unchanged otherwise.

In 2008, the league was again demoted one level when the 3. Liga was established. However, this changed nothing in the league's status as a feeder league to the NOFV-Oberliga.

The league is sponsored by door and window maker WEKU and carries therefore the official name of WEKU Sachsenliga. This is an unusual fact in Germany as football leagues don't normally carry sponsorship names.

The league had, in the 2007–08 season, the unique distinction of having a former UEFA Cup Winners' Cup finalist in its ranks, the re-formed 1. FC Lok Leipzig, loser of the 1987 final.

The Landesligen of Thuringia and Saxony are unique in their naming as every other league in Germany of this standing carries the name Verbandsliga. This was done so simply by choice of the local football associations (German: Fußballverband) in Saxony and Thuringia and the name could be changed to Verbandsliga if they wish to do so.

Due to the changes to the German league system, the runner-up in 2007–08, Lok Leipzig was also promoted after winning a play-off round with the runner-up from the Verbandsliga Mecklenburg-Vorpommern, FC Schönberg 95.

League champions
The league champions:

Founding members of the league
The league was established from twelve clubs from three leagues in 1990. Most of the East German clubs changed their names in the years after the reunion, some reverted to their old ones after a brief period, current names, when different from the one in 1990, are listed. The clubs are:

From the Bezirksliga Chemnitz:
VFC Plauen 
SpVgg Zschopau, now BSG Motor Zschopau again
Rot-Weiß Werdau
SV Tanne Thalheim

From the Bezirksliga Dresden:
Fortschritt Neustadt, now SSV Neustadt-Hohwald
FV Gröditz
Wismut Pirna-Copitz, now VfL Pirna-Copitz 
VfB Zittau

From the Bezirksliga Leipzig:
SSV Markranstädt
Motor Grimma, later SV 1919 Grimma, now FC Grimma 
SV Motor Altenburg (now playing in the Thüringen league system)
1. FSV Wurzen, now ATSV Frisch-Auf Wurzen

References

Sources
 Deutschlands Fußball in Zahlen,  An annual publication with tables and results from the Bundesliga to Verbandsliga/Landesliga. DSFS.
 Kicker Almanach,  The yearbook on German football from Bundesliga to Oberliga, since 1937. Kicker Sports Magazine.
 Die Deutsche Liga-Chronik 1945-2005  History of German football from 1945 to 2005 in tables. DSFS. 2006.

External links 
 Das deutsche Fussball Archiv  Historic German league tables
 The North East German Football Association (NOFV)  
 The Sachsen Football Association 

Sac
Football competitions in Saxony
1990 establishments in East Germany
Sports leagues established in 1990